{{DISPLAYTITLE:C9H20}}
The molecular formula C9H20 (molar mass: 128.25 g/mol, exact mass: 128.1565 u) may refer to:

 Nonane
 List of isomers of nonane
 Tetraethylmethane